The CTBC Taichung Headquarters, is a skyscraper office building located in Taichung's 7th Redevelopment Zone, Xitun District, Taichung, Taiwan. Construction of the building began in 2014 and it was completed in 2017. It houses the headquarters of CTBC Financial Holding as well as Taiwan Life Insurance.

Design
The building was designed by the Spanish architectural team EMBT led by the architects Enric Miralles and Benedetta Tagliabue. The design adopts an open and curved form in contrast to the traditional rectangular urban landscape, allowing the building to communicate and establish connections with the surrounding vertical buildings, thus creating a recognizable landmark in Taichung.

See also 
 List of tallest buildings in Taiwan
 List of tallest buildings in Taichung
 Taichung's 7th Redevelopment Zone
 CTBC Financial Holding
 CTBC Financial Park

References

2017 establishments in Taiwan
Skyscraper office buildings in Taichung
Office buildings completed in 2017
Taichung's 7th Redevelopment Zone
Bank headquarters in Taiwan